FC Spartak Ryazan was a Russian football team from Ryazan. It played professionally in 1949 and from 1959 to 1999. It played on the second-highest level (Soviet First League and Russian First Division) in 1949, 1959–1962, 1968 and 1992–1993. The best position they achieved was 2nd place in 1992.

The team was dissolved after the 1999 season, and their spot in the Russian Second Division was taken over by FC Ryazan, that club renamed itself to FC Spartak Ryazan for a part of the 2000 season only.

Team name history
 1937 – FC Spartak Ryazan
 1938 – Ryazan City Team
 1939–1958 – FC Spartak Ryazan
 1959–1960 – FC Trud Ryazan
 1961–1967 – FC Spartak Ryazan
 1968 – FC Zvezda Ryazan
 1969–1986 – FC Spartak Ryazan
 1987 – FC Sapphire Ryazan
 1988–1994 – FC Torpedo Ryazan
 1995–1999 – FC Spartak Ryazan

External links
  Team history at KLISF

Association football clubs established in 1937
Association football clubs disestablished in 2000
Defunct football clubs in Russia
Sport in Ryazan
1937 establishments in Russia
2000 disestablishments in Russia